Michael Holve (born November 16, 1967 in Huntington, New York) is an American author, photographer, programmer and Linux practitioner.

Early start in computing
At the dawn of the Personal Computer (PC) age, Holve was programming in BASIC at age 10, collaborated with his math teacher to write a ballistic simulation game at 12 and had his first job, teaching others to use a computer at 14 - primarily using Radio Shack/Tandy TRS-80 and Apple ][ computers. At age 15, he moved on to IBM PC (and compatible) computers, authoring a business contacts database and various utilities for playing Advanced Dungeons & Dragons. By age 17 he was programming and managing PDP/VAX minicomputers for a local business as his first full-time job, authoring an import/export license tracking software in VAX Business Basic.

Linux, Solaris and Unix operating systems
Holve started one of the earliest Linux websites in 1994 which came to feature one of the first "Quickcam pages" broadcasting a still image every few minutes automatically to a website, it was one of the first instances of what would later be called "lifecasting" - showing the world Holve's daily life.  The Connectix Quickcam was new at the time, offering only a low resolution black and white image - and getting it to work with Linux was often a challenge.  In an effort to ease adoption of this new technology, Holve wrote a HOW-TO on the subject and distributed shell scripts to handle the task in the public domain.  The feature was quite popular, attracting thousands of daily visitors from around the world.

The site went on to become popular, featuring articles in a HOW-TO format.  One such article, "A Tutorial on Using Rsync"  featured on the Rsync homepage almost since its inception.  Another article became the de facto reference on using Epson Stylus printers with Linux.  At its peak, "Everything Linux" logged up to 4,685 people and 1,838,184 hits a day.

The site featured a forum, which allowed a community to form.

Early contributions to Linux include several HOW-TOs on subjects ranging from multimedia, printing, window managers and customization of the desktop, scanners and the PalmPilot PDA.

Other notable websites included "Everything Mac" and "Everything Unix" which catered to their specific communities, though neither enjoyed the success of the Linux and Solaris communities.

"Everything Solaris"  is one of the only remaining online Solaris community websites after Oracle's acquisition of Sun Microsystems.

Holve is linked to various Open Source projects - including Rsync, ProFTP, Apache, SANE, perltidy and Ghostprint for his work on documenting them.

Linux advocacy
Holve is a Linux advocate and Solaris insider. He was active during the 1990s and early 2000s  and brought adoption of Linux to several companies as well as the State University of New York, Stony Brook.  Projects included adoption of Linux as both a server and desktop platform for several companies, an early database cluster for a nascent global search engine and as the backbone of the SUNYSB Department of Family Medicine's Internet presence, including its first website.

Apache web server
Author of one of the first GUIs for managing the Apache web server, TkApache v1.0 was released into the public domain and dedicated to the Open Source and Linux communities at ApacheCon on October 15, 1998. The early success of TkApache led to the design of the next generation tool, Mohawk.  At the time, many GUI projects were now underway (such as webmin) which expanded to a system-wide configuration interface.  It was decided to cancel further development of Mohawk.

Software contributions to open source
TkApache - GUI for the Apache web server 
Mohawk - GUI for the Apache web server 
iVote - High-performance Perl/mod-perl visual voting system 
CPU Status - Status of Sun (SPARC/Intel) system CPUs CGI

Photography
A current project includes the formation of an informational site for users of the Leica "M system", La Vida Leica!. and author of nearly 50 reviews and 30 articles for the site.  Several of the articles have been translated into Russian by - and posted on - Leica Camera Russia's blog.

OS X upgrade fiasco
When Apple introduced the OS X 10.1 update in 2001, there was controversy over modifying the CD to be able to install directly from it, rather than having to install 10.04 first, followed by an upgrade.  The hack first appeared on MacFixIt's forum.  Holve went on to further document the procedure with a step-by-step HOW-TO, which earned him the ire of the Apple legal team.  A lot of press followed, including a cease and desist letter from Apple Inc.

Publications
 Featured in Solaris 9 for Dummies
 Featured in Building Embedded Linux Systems
 Featured in The Quick Road to an Intranet Web Server: Apache and Linux make the task simple
 Building Embedded Linux Systems by O'Reilly Media

References

External links 
 LitPixel
 La Vida Leica
 Everything Linux
 Everything Mac (discontinued)
 Everything Solaris (discontinued)
 Xterra Firma

1967 births
Living people
People from Huntington, New York
American photographers
American computer programmers
American male writers